August Peisker (1877 – February 1962) was a Swiss sculptor. His work was part of the sculpture event in the art competition at the 1928 Summer Olympics.

References

1877 births
1962 deaths
20th-century Swiss sculptors
Swiss sculptors
Olympic competitors in art competitions
People from Náchod District
20th-century Swiss male artists
Austro-Hungarian emigrants to Switzerland